Mecyclothorax convexicollis is a species of ground beetle in the subfamily Psydrinae. It was described by Emden in 1937.

References

convexicollis
Beetles described in 1937